Masamichi Yabuki (born July 9, 1992) is a Japanese professional boxer who held the WBC light flyweight title from 2021 until 2022. As of November 2022, he is ranked as the world's second best active light flyweight by BoxRec, fourth by the Transnational Boxing Rankings Board, and sixth by The Ring.

Professional career

Early career
Yabuki made his professional debut against Shohei Horii on March 27, 2016. He won the fight by a first-round technical knockout. He would go on to amass a 7–3 record over the next two years, most notably losing a close unanimous decision against Junto Nakatani on December 23, 2016, and a split decision to Daniel Matellon on September 28, 2018.

Yabuki won his next three fights, achieving stoppage victories against Bae Min-Chul, Ryuto Oho and Rikito Shiba, before he was scheduled to face Tsuyoshi Sato for the vacant Japanese light flyweight title on July 26, 2020. Yabuki stopped Sato with a left hook, near the end of the first round. He was scheduled to make his first title defense against Toshimasa Ouchi on December 26, 2020. He won the fight by unanimous decision.

WBC light flyweight champion

Yabuki vs. Shiro
Yabuki, at the time the #1 ranked WBC light flyweight contender, was scheduled to challenge the reigning WBC light flyweight champion Kenshiro Teraji, in Shiro's ninth title defense, on September 10, 2021, at the City Gym in Kyoto, Japan. The bout was later postponed for September 22, 2021, as both Shiro and his coach tested positive for COVID-19. The fight was rescheduled for September 22, 2021. Yabuki won the fight by a tenth-round technical knockout. He appeared to be ahead on the scorecards heading into the tenth round, which prompted Shiro to increase his pace and volume. Although Shiro seemed close to finishing him, Yabuki managed to take over the round near its end and unload with volume which forced the referee to stop the fight.

Yabuki vs. Shiro II
On November 15, 2021, representatives of Kenshiro Teraji and Masamichi Yabuki held a press conference to announce that they’d agreed to a rematch, which would be held sometime in spring of 2022. The rematch for the WBC title was officially announced on January 24, 2022. It took place at the City Gym in Kyoto, Japan, on March 19, 2022. Yabuki lost the fight by a third-round knockout.

Post title reign
Yabuki faced the undefeated Thanongsak Simsri on September 10, 2022 in what was promoted as a world title prelude. He won the fight by a seventh-round technical knockout. Yabuki knocked his opponent down twice prior to the stoppage, in the second and sixth rounds. During the in-ring post-fight speech, Yabuki revealed that he had injured his pelvis in the third round. He also announced that he was considering moving up to fight for a title at flyweight The fight was held at a catchweight of 50 kilograms. 

Yabuki faced Ronald Chacon on January 28, 2023. He won the fight by an eleventh-round technical knockout.

Professional boxing record

See also
List of world light-flyweight boxing champions
List of Japanese boxing world champions

References

External links

1992 births
Living people
Sportspeople from Mie Prefecture
Japanese male boxers
World light-flyweight boxing champions
World Boxing Council champions